The Columbus Blue Jackets (often simply referred to as the Jackets) are a professional ice hockey team based in Columbus, Ohio. They compete in the National Hockey League (NHL) as a member of the Metropolitan Division in the Eastern Conference, and began play as an expansion team in 2000.

The Blue Jackets struggled in their initial years, failing to win 30 games in a season until 2005–06. The team qualified for the Stanley Cup playoffs for the first time in 2009, but were swept by the Detroit Red Wings. Columbus ultimately notched their first playoff game victory in the 2014 playoffs, and won their first playoff series in the 2019 playoffs against the Tampa Bay Lightning, becoming the first team in NHL history to sweep a Presidents' Trophy winner in the first round.

The Blue Jackets' name and logos are inspired by Ohio's Civil War history. The Blue Jackets play their home games at Nationwide Arena in downtown Columbus, which opened in 2000. They are affiliated with the Cleveland Monsters of the AHL.

Franchise history

Building a new franchise (1997–2000)
Prior to the establishment of the Blue Jackets, the last NHL team in the state of Ohio was the Cleveland Barons, who played from 1976 to 1978. In Columbus, the Blue Jackets replaced the Columbus Chill of the ECHL, who played in the city from 1991 to 1999. The Chill played at the Ohio Expo Center Coliseum, where they set a minor league hockey record by selling out 83 consecutive games.

In November 1996, five investors formed a partnership called Columbus Hockey Limited, who then submitted an application and a $100,000 fee to the NHL office. The voters of Columbus were considering a referendum to build a publicly financed arena, a major step toward approval of their NHL bid. When League Commissioner Gary Bettman visited Columbus to meet with the community's leaders about the franchise proposal, there was concern that the voters might not pass the needed referendum. The civic leaders told Bettman that they would not be willing to foot the bill for the team if the referendum failed. However, just after the meeting adjourned, John H. McConnell (one of those who entered the bid) privately guaranteed Bettman that an arena would be built, referendum or not.

Columbus' hopes for the bid dimmed when the May referendum failed. However, Nationwide announced on May 31, 1997, that it would finance the $150-million arena. Subsequently, on June 25, 1997, the NHL announced that Columbus would receive a new franchise. Afterwards a "Name the Team" contest was held with the help of Wendy's throughout central Ohio during the month of August 1997. The franchise received 14,000 entries and, with help from the NHL, narrowed the list down to 10 names. Then, with the information received from owner McConnell regarding Columbus' history, the league and the franchise narrowed the list of potential names down to two – Blue Jackets and Justice. The former, which referenced Ohio's contributions to the American Civil War, was eventually announced as the team name in November.

On June 23, 2000, the NHL's two newest teams, the Blue Jackets and the Minnesota Wild, took part in the 2000 NHL Expansion Draft in Calgary, Alberta. Under the draft's rules, 26 of the NHL's active 28 teams were allowed to protect one goaltender, five defensemen, and nine forwards, or two goaltenders, three defensemen, and seven forwards. The Atlanta Thrashers and Nashville Predators both had their full rosters protected because they were the two newest teams, only being in existence for one and two years, respectively. Both the Blue Jackets and Wild had to use their first 24 selections on three goaltenders, eight defensemen, and thirteen forwards. Their final two picks could be players of any position.

With the first-overall choice, the Blue Jackets selected goaltender Rick Tabaracci from the Colorado Avalanche. Over the course of the draft, Columbus picked up goalie Dwayne Roloson, defensemen Lyle Odelein and Mathieu Schneider, and forwards Geoff Sanderson, Turner Stevenson and Dallas Drake, among others. Instead of joining Columbus, Roloson signed with the American Hockey League's Worcester IceCats, Schneider left for the Los Angeles Kings, and the St. Louis Blues signed Drake. Columbus also traded Stevenson to the New Jersey Devils to complete an earlier transaction.

The Blue Jackets and Wild were granted concessions by some franchises who could not protect their full rosters. The San Jose Sharks traded Jan Caloun, a ninth-round pick in the 2000 NHL Entry Draft, and a 2001 conditional pick to Columbus; in return, the Blue Jackets agreed not to select the Sharks' unprotected goaltender Evgeni Nabokov. On June 24, at the 2000 NHL Entry Draft, Columbus selected Rostislav Klesla fourth overall.

Early years (2000–2005)
The Blue Jackets played their first regular season game on October 7, 2000, a 5–3 loss to the Chicago Blackhawks. Bruce Gardiner scored the franchise's first goal. Columbus finished with a 28–39–9–6 record for 71 points, last in the Central Division, and failed to qualify for the playoffs. Geoff Sanderson became the first player in team history to score 30 goals. Ron Tugnutt, who was signed in the summer of 2000, supplied solid goaltending with 22 wins, which tied the 74-year-old NHL record for wins by an expansion-team goaltender (New York Rangers' Lorne Chabot also had 22 wins in 1926–27).

The Blue Jackets finished next-to-last in the NHL in the following season, with only 57 points. Ray Whitney, acquired from the Florida Panthers the previous season, led the team in scoring with 61 points, setting a franchise record. Tragedy struck the Blue Jackets organization in March 2002 when 13-year-old Brittanie Cecil was killed after a deflected puck shot by Espen Knutsen struck her in the head while she was in the stands at Nationwide Arena. As a result of her death, large nylon mesh nets were installed behind the goals in all NHL arenas to shield spectators from pucks going over the glass. The team also wore small red hearts with the initials "BNC" on their helmets.

During the off-season, the Blue Jackets traded a second-round draft pick (32nd overall) and Ron Tugnutt to the Dallas Stars in exchange for Dallas' first-round pick (20th overall) in the 2002 Entry Draft. On the morning of the draft, Columbus traded the third-overall pick and the option to flip draft spots in 2003 to the Florida Panthers; in return, Columbus received the first-overall pick, which they used to select Rick Nash.

The 2002–03 season started with Columbus putting up a 7–5–1–1 record after the first 14 games. However, as expectations from their fans grew higher, the team came back to mediocrity, finishing last in the Central Division for the third consecutive season with 69 points and missing the playoffs once again. Dave King, who had been the team's head coach since their debut in 2000, was fired mid-season and replaced by general manager Doug MacLean. Marc Denis was named starting goalie; he played a franchise-record 77 games that season and set a league record with 4,511 minutes played in 2002–03. He tied for second all-time for games played in a season by a goaltender, just two shy of the league record held by St. Louis Blues' Grant Fuhr in the 1995–96 season.

The 2003–04 season was another losing season for the Blue Jackets despite key additions in the off-season. Checking center Todd Marchant was signed to a five-year contract in July from the Edmonton Oilers. Defenseman Darryl Sydor, known to play strong offense as well, was acquired from the Dallas Stars for Mike Sillinger and a draft pick. MacLean stepped aside as head coach midway through the season, giving way to Gerard Gallant. The Blue Jackets finished with just 62 points (the second-lowest total in their short history), but it was enough to help them break out of last place in the Central Division for the first time, finishing ahead of the Chicago Blackhawks. Nash was one of the few bright spots for the team; his 41 goals tied Jarome Iginla and Ilya Kovalchuk for the Maurice "Rocket" Richard Trophy (as League leader in goals scored).

In the 2004 off-season, the NHL Players' Association (NHLPA) and NHL administration failed to renew their collective bargaining agreement. September 14, 2004, marked the beginning of the lockout of the 2004–05 season. No games were played and the Stanley Cup was not awarded for the first time since the flu epidemic of 1919. An agreement was made on July 13, 2005, and the lockout officially ended nine days later on July 22, 2005.

Rick Nash era and rebuilding (2005–2012)
In the summer of 2005, rugged Colorado Avalanche defenseman Adam Foote agreed to a three-year deal with the team. Heading into the 2005–06 season, it appeared the Blue Jackets would finally take the next step and make the playoffs. Instead, injuries to Rick Nash, Rostislav Klesla and Gilbert Brule, the team's 2005 first-round pick, led to the team putting up a dismal 9–25–1 record through its first 35 games. Superstar Sergei Fedorov was acquired from the Mighty Ducks of Anaheim; Anaheim received Tyler Wright and Francois Beauchemin, and later claimed Todd Marchant off waivers. While again failing to make the playoffs, Columbus did manage to improve. They had the best overtime record in the NHL (14–4) and finished the season with franchise records for wins (35) and points (74). For the first time ever, they earned a third-place finish in the Central Division, behind Detroit and Nashville.

The 2006–07 season saw several changes made to the team. In the off-season, Marc Denis was dealt to the Tampa Bay Lightning for forward Fredrik Modin and goaltender Fredrik Norrena, making way for Pascal Leclaire to take the starting job. The Blue Jackets also signed Anson Carter when it looked as if Nikolay Zherdev would be playing the season in Russia; in late September, however, Zherdev and general manager Doug MacLean were able to reach a compromise. Partway through the season, on November 13, 2006, Gerard Gallant was relieved of his duties as head coach. The next day, Gary Agnew was named his interim replacement. On November 22, Ken Hitchcock, former coach of the Dallas Stars and Philadelphia Flyers, was named the new head coach, effective the following day. Under Hitchcock's first year, two milestones were set: on December 10, 2006, the Blue Jackets scored a team-record five power-play goals in a 6–2 win over the Ottawa Senators, and on April 3, 2007, the Blue Jackets broke the modern-day record for most times being shut-out in a season (16) with a 3–0 loss to the Detroit Red Wings.

On April 18, 2007, Doug MacLean, the team's first general manager and president, was fired after nine years and six seasons at the helm without a playoff berth. Mike Priest, president of Blue Jackets parent company JMAC, Inc., was named president of the club, while Assistant general manager Jim Clark served as general manager until the Blue Jackets named Edmonton Oilers Assistant general manager Scott Howson as the new general manager on June 15, 2007. On October 4, 2007, the Blue Jackets announced their affiliation with the Elmira Jackals, which replaced their former affiliation with the Dayton Bombers as the club's ECHL affiliate.

The 2007–08 season, the club's first full season under Hitchcock, started off well as the Jackets got off to their best start in franchise history, starting with a 4–0 shutout of the defending Stanley Cup champion Anaheim Ducks. At the trade deadline on February 26, 2008, however, apparently unable to agree on a new contract and amid some controversy, Blue Jackets captain Adam Foote requested a trade to the Colorado Avalanche, which was granted. The Blue Jackets received a pair of conditional picks in return. A few weeks later, on March 12, 2008, former Blue Jackets number-one draft pick Rick Nash was named the new team captain. Despite this, Columbus managed its best season record to date, staying above a .500 game wins average until the final game of the season and finishing fourth in the Central Division with 80 points. After the season, Nash was announced as the cover player for the NHL 2K9 video game by Take-Two Interactive.

At the 2008 NHL Entry Draft, the Blue Jackets selected Nikita Filatov with the sixth overall pick. They also traded away the 19th overall pick (acquired from the Colorado Avalanche in exchange for Adam Foote) for R. J. Umberger. The Blue Jackets made many trades in the 2008 off-season. Gilbert Brule was traded to the Edmonton Oilers for Raffi Torres. Enigmatic forward Nikolay Zherdev and Dan Fritsche were traded to the New York Rangers in exchange for defensemen Fedor Tyutin and Christian Backman. The Blue Jackets also signed free agents Kristian Huselius and Mike Commodore to multi-year contracts. On July 9, 2008, the Blue Jackets announced they signed Hitchcock to a three-year extension to remain as head coach.

During the 2008–09 season, the Blue Jackets made two trades which greatly played to their benefit. Forward Jason Williams was acquired from the Atlanta Thrashers in exchange for defenseman Clay Wilson and a sixth-round draft pick. The Blue Jackets were also involved with the first major deal of the 2009 NHL trade deadline, by trading goaltender Pascal Leclaire and a second-round draft pick to the Ottawa Senators for skilled center Antoine Vermette. The changes in scenery benefited both players and the Jackets; Williams scored 28 points in his first 36 games as a Jacket, while Vermette scored 11 points in his first 14 games with the team. Rick Nash scored 79 points throughout the season, setting a franchise record.

On April 8, 2009, the Columbus Blue Jackets secured the first Stanley Cup playoff berth in the franchise's eight-year history with a 4–3 shootout win over the Chicago Blackhawks. However, they were swept in the first round by the Detroit Red Wings in four games, and would not qualify for the playoffs for the next four seasons. With 21 games remaining and sitting four points out of eighth in the Western Conference, the Blue Jackets dealt long time defenseman Rostislav Klesla and Dane Byers to the Phoenix Coyotes in exchange for Scottie Upshall and Sami Lepisto at the trade deadline on February 28, 2011.

In the 2011 off-season, in an attempt to make a serious playoff run, the Blue Jackets traded 2007 first-round pick Jakub Voracek, their 2011 first-round pick (Sean Couturier) and a third-round pick (Nick Cousins) to the Philadelphia Flyers for All-Star center Jeff Carter. They also signed several free agents: James Wisniewski, Vaclav Prospal and Radek Martinek. However, after a disastrous start to the 2011–12 season that saw the firing of head coach Scott Arniel, Carter was traded to the Los Angeles Kings for Jack Johnson and a conditional first-round pick after playing just 39 games with the Blue Jackets. The Blue Jackets also traded veteran centers Antoine Vermette and Samuel Pahlsson for goaltender Curtis McElhinney and several draft picks at the trade deadline. There was also heavy speculation that captain Rick Nash would be traded at the deadline. Although Nash was not traded, general manager Scott Howson publicly announced that he had privately requested a trade, a move that has stirred up much controversy. Nash was eventually traded to the New York Rangers on July 23, 2012, for Brandon Dubinsky, Artem Anisimov, prospect Tim Erixon and a 2013 first-round draft pick. At the 2012 NHL Entry Draft, the Blue Jackets traded their second and fourth round picks to the Philadelphia Flyers for the eventual winner of the 2013 Vezina Trophy, goaltender Sergei Bobrovsky.

The 2012–13 lockout and season saw changes to the executive and front office of the organization. John Davidson was named as president of hockey operations for the Blue Jackets on October 24. On February 12, Scott Howson was relieved of his duties as general manager. Jarmo Kekalainen, who had previously worked with Davidson in St. Louis, was hired away from Jokerit of the Finnish SM-liiga to be the new general manager becoming the first European born general manager in the NHL. The Blue Jackets then traded for All-Star forward Marian Gaborik. The Blue Jackets just missed the playoffs via a tiebreaker against the Minnesota Wild, who had more regulation and overtime wins (ROW).

Move to the Eastern Conference and the John Tortorella era (2013–2021)

The Blue Jackets moved into the Metropolitan Division of the Eastern Conference in the 2013–14 season after spending its first 13 seasons in the Central Division of the Western Conference. The other teams in the Metropolitan Division consist of the Carolina Hurricanes, New Jersey Devils, New York Islanders, New York Rangers, Philadelphia Flyers, Pittsburgh Penguins and Washington Capitals, the latter six of which once composed the old Patrick Division. On April 9, 2014, the Blue Jackets clinched their second playoff spot in franchise history by winning a 3–1 game against the Dallas Stars. This game was also noted for being a game resumed after being postponed on March 10, 2014, due to Rich Peverley's cardiac event in which the Blue Jackets led 1–0. The NHL decided to keep the goal scored by Nathan Horton and resumed the game with a full 60 minutes. Nathan Horton made history by being credited for scoring a goal while not suiting up for the game.

The Blue Jackets faced the Pittsburgh Penguins in the first round (Eastern Conference Quarter-finals) of the 2014 Stanley Cup playoffs. This series had a trend that was noted for making 3–1 leads end up as 4–3 loss. Game 1 and 2 were at the Consol Energy Center in downtown Pittsburgh. The Blue Jackets made a large jump in history when Jack Johnson scored the first goal of the game. This was the first time in franchise history that Columbus ever led a postseason game. The Jackets lead the game 3–1 at one point from goals by Mark Letestu and Derek MacKenzie. However, the Penguins rallied to win it 4–3. Game 2 was the opposite. Pittsburgh led 3–1 at one point, but Columbus rallied to win Game 2 4–3 by an overtime goal from Matt Calvert. This was the first playoff victory in franchise history. Pittsburgh won Game 3 by a score of 4–3. Game 4 was a memorable night at Nationwide Arena. Columbus was down 3–0, and 3–1 by the end of the first period. Boone Jenner and Ryan Johansen scored to make it 3–2 by the end of the second period. Brandon Dubinsky scored the game-tying goal with 22.5 seconds left in regulation, after a miss-play with the puck by Marc-Andre Fleury. Nick Foligno went on to score the game-winning goal in overtime. In the locker room during intermission, he supposedly told the team that he will score the game-winner. Pittsburgh, however, went on to win the next two games and took the best-of-seven series in six games.

The 2014–15 season was most notable for the number of injuries the Jackets incurred. The Jackets lead the league in man-games lost with 502. At one point, the injured reserve list consisted of 15 players, including stars Sergei Bobrovsky, Brandon Dubinsky, Jack Johnson, and Ryan Murray. When the team's injured players began to return in late February, they were able to accumulate wins the way they had the previous two seasons and in the process, set a franchise record earning nine consecutive wins. However, the Blue Jackets still finished fifth in the Metropolitan Division and missed the playoffs by nine points despite a 42–35–5 record. On May 20, 2015, Nick Foligno was named the sixth captain in team history. The position had been vacant since Rick Nash was traded to the New York Rangers in July 2012. On June 30, 2015, the Jackets traded centers Marko Dano and Artem Anisimov, along with wingers Jeremy Morin and Corey Tropp, to the Chicago Blackhawks in exchange for Brandon Saad. This move was the subject of much controversy in Chicago since Blackhawks general manager Stan Bowman had publicly said that Saad was going to be a part of the organization for many years to come. The Jackets also acquired Michael Paliotta and Alex Broadhurst in the trade. The Jackets signed center Gregory Campbell from the Boston Bruins a few days later.

The Blue Jackets initially went into the 2015–16 season with high expectations. However, the team got off to an inauspicious start by losing their first eight regular season games in regulation. This prompted the Jackets to fire head coach Todd Richards and hire John Tortorella in his place. On January 6, 2016, the Blue Jackets traded Ryan Johansen to the Nashville Predators in exchange for defenseman Seth Jones. The Blue Jackets record at the end of the season was 34–40–8, and were ranked 27th overall in the NHL. They closed out the season on a high note, however, as they won the season finale against the defending Stanley Cup champion Blackhawks, overcoming a 3–0 deficit after the first period to win 5–4 in overtime.

The Blue Jackets set three franchise records during the 2016–17 season. On November 4, 2016, the Blue Jackets scored a franchise-record ten goals in a 10–0 shutout win against the Montreal Canadiens, becoming the first team to do so since 2011 (when the St. Louis Blues beat the Detroit Red Wings 10–3). In mid-November, the Blue Jackets got a franchise record seventh consecutive win at home. During a franchise-record 16-game win streak that started in late November, Tortorella recorded his 500th career win in a 4–3 Blue Jackets overtime win on the road against the Vancouver Canucks, becoming the first American-born head coach to reach 500 wins. The team had a record of 14–0–0 in December. The team's win streak ended in early January when they lost 5–0 to the Washington Capitals. The win streak was the second longest in NHL history behind the 1992–93 Pittsburgh Penguins' 17 consecutive games. The team finished with a record of 50–24–8 and 108 points, setting a franchise record.

During the first round of the 2017 playoffs, the Blue Jackets were placed in a matchup against the Pittsburgh Penguins. The team lost three straight games to begin the series, but won the fourth game to save themselves from elimination. This game in which they won 5–4 marked the Blue Jackets' first regulation win in the Stanley Cup Playoffs. Despite this, they would ultimately lose the series in five games. In the following off-season, on June 23, 2017, the Jackets made another deal with the Blackhawks sending Brandon Saad back to Chicago for Artemi Panarin and Tyler Motte.

The Blue Jackets returned to the playoffs in 2018 as a wild card qualifier, going in back-to-back years for the first time. There they faced the Metropolitan Division champion Washington Capitals in the first round, winning the first two games in overtime and their first series lead. However, they lost the next four games and the series in six games.

The Blue Jackets returned to the playoffs the following year, where they swept the Presidents' Trophy winner Tampa Bay Lightning in the First Round to win their first ever playoff series, but lost their Second Round series in six games to the Boston Bruins. The Blue Jackets would then lose long-time starting goaltender Sergei Bobrovsky, centre Matt Duchene, and the team's leader in points, Artemi Panarin, in free agency during the 2019 off-season.

On March 12, 2020, the 2019–20 season was paused due to the COVID-19 pandemic, with the remaining regular games being officially cancelled on May 26. On August 1, the season resumed and would finish following a 24-team playoff format, with the top 4 teams in each conference playing in a seeding round-robin tournament and the 8 lower-seeded teams in each conference competing in a best-of-five series, the Qualifying Round, to be held in two host cities in Canada. The Blue Jackets were qualified for the Qualifying Round, eventually defeating the Toronto Maple Leafs in five games. Then, in a first-round rematch of the previous playoffs, the Blue Jackets lost to the Tampa Bay Lightning in five games.

During the 2020 off-season, star forward Pierre-Luc Dubois signed a two-year extension with the Blue Jackets but would later request a trade from the team. The shortened 2020–21 season saw the Blue Jackets placed in the Central Division, under the NHL's realigned divisions as part of its COVID-19 policies. After being benched for the second and third periods in what would end up being his last game with the team on January 21, 2021, Dubois and a 2022 third-round pick were traded to the Winnipeg Jets in exchange for left winger Patrik Laine and Columbus native Jack Roslovic on January 23. Veteran players David Savard and captain Nick Foligno would also be traded to the Tampa Bay Lightning and the Toronto Maple Leafs, respectively. The team continued to struggle and finished last in their division, missing the playoffs for the first time since the 2015-16 season. Subsequently, it was announced that Tortorella and the Blue Jackets were mutually parting ways after six seasons.

Rebuilding (2021–present)
Following the departures of Tortorella and of key players in the past few seasons, the Blue Jackets seemed headed into another "rebuild," starting with the promotion of assistant coach Brad Larsen to head coach on June 10, 2021. Seth Jones would then be traded to the Chicago Blackhawks in exchange for defenceman Adam Boqvist and a 2021 first-round pick (Cole Sillinger), and Cam Atkinson to the Philadelphia Flyers for former first-round pick Jakub Voracek. Other notable off-season signings were 2020 first-round pick Yegor Chinakhov, forward Sean Kuraly from the Boston Bruins, and defenceman Jake Bean from the Carolina Hurricanes.

The 2021–22 season saw the Blue Jackets return to the Metropolitan Division as the NHL reverted to its 82-game regular season. In their season-opening game against the Arizona Coyotes, the team honored backup goaltender Matiss Kivlenieks, who had tragically died in a fireworks accident during the off-season, on July 4, 2021. They raised his number to hang inside Nationwide Arena for the duration of the season. His family also performed a ceremonial puck drop and goaltender Elvis Merzlikins was allowed to wear #80 during said game. They had also established the Matiss Kivlenieks Memorial Fund in his memory in order to promote the growth of hockey in Columbus and his homeland of Latvia.

On October 12, 2021, Boone Jenner was named the seventh captain in franchise history. Under his captaincy, the Blue Jackets started their season with a strong 7-3-0 record—including being unbeaten at home—in their first ten games, even defeating the eventual Stanley Cup champions Colorado Avalanche in back-to-back games. Despite an improved offense and scoring capabilities, however, an inexperienced defense core and issues with special teams and penalty kill caught up with the team as the season progressed, finishing among the top 10 teams with the highest goals against average. On April 16, 2022, they were officially eliminated from playoff contention when the Washington Capitals defeated the Montreal Canadiens. They finished sixth in their division, with a 37-38-7 record and 81 points.

In the 2022 NHL draft, the Blue Jackets acquired Czech defenceman David Jiricek of HC Škoda Plzeň (6th overall) and Canadian defenceman Denton Mateychuk of the Moose Jaw Warriors (12th overall) in the first round. During the 2022 free agency, the Blue Jackets shocked the hockey world by signing Calgary Flames superstar Johnny Gaudreau to a seven-year contract, following the signing of his teammate, defenceman Erik Gudbranson, to a four-year contract on July 13, 2022. The Gaudreau signing stunned fans and hockey media alike as the franchise had gained a reputation of being unable to sign or retain star players—something GM Kekalainen had wanted to disprove. Gaudreau, who had reportedly received more attractive offers from the New Jersey Devils and the New York Islanders, decided to play for less compensation for Columbus, explaining to the media that he believed in their "potential." Subsequently, in order to re-sign Laine to what would be a four-year contract following the Gaudreau and Gudbranson signings, the Blue Jackets traded right winger Oliver Bjorkstrand to the Seattle Kraken for 2023 late-round picks. It was also reported over a month later that centre Alexandre Texier would not play for the team in the 2022–23 season due to personal reasons. Following the Bjorkstrand trade and Texier's hiatus, Jenner and Werenski had become the remaining active players still with the team who were part of their famous "sweep" of the Tampa Bay Lightning.

Team information

Team name

The name "Blue Jackets" was chosen to celebrate "patriotism, pride, and the rich Civil War history in the state of Ohio and city of Columbus." When President Abraham Lincoln requested that Ohio raise ten regiments at the outbreak of the Civil War, the state responded by raising a total of 23 volunteer infantry regiments for three months of service. Ohio also produced a number of great Civil War figures, including William Tecumseh Sherman, Ulysses S. Grant, Philip Sheridan and George Custer. Columbus itself was host to large military bases, Camp Chase and Camp Thomas, which saw hundreds of thousands of Union soldiers and thousands of Confederate prisoners during the Civil War.

Logos and jerseys

The team logo is a stylized version of the flag of Ohio, which is a burgee (i.e. swallowtail pennant), in the form of a "C" wrapped around a star, representing both patriotism and Columbus's status as state capital. Previously used as an alternate logo starting in 2003, it became the primary logo as part of a Reebok-sponsored redesign for the 2007–08 season. The original logo had a red ribbon with 13 stars representing the Thirteen Colonies, unfurled in the shape of the team's initials, CBJ, with an electric gold hockey stick cutting through the center to represent the "J." An additional star atop the stick represented Columbus's status as state capital. From 2003 to 2015, the team's jerseys featured an alternate logo, a Civil War cap with crossed hockey sticks, on the shoulders.

Since their inception, the Blue Jackets have worn navy and white jerseys with red pants. The jerseys have been tweaked numerous times over the years, mainly in the crest and striping treatment.

The Blue Jackets unveiled a new third jersey in the 2010–11 season, using a vintage hockey jersey design. In the spirit of its Civil War theme, it sports a union blue base with white stripes on the sleeves and on the shoulder padding. The crest features the team's Civil War-era cannon. It honors the team's founder, John H. McConnell, with his initials on the neckline, as well as its slogan "We fight, we march!" on the inside of the collar. During the 2015 NHL Draft, it was revealed that the cannon crest had replaced the hat logo on the shoulders of the home and away jerseys, with a color change to match the jerseys' color scheme.

For the 2020–21 season, the Blue Jackets would wear "Reverse Retro" alternate uniforms designed by Adidas. The uniform resembled the original white "Stinger" uniforms from 2000 to 2007 but with a red base and white sleeve stripes.

Starting with the 2022–23 season, the Blue Jackets' road white uniform would be paired with blue pants, a combination the team previously wore on May 1, 2021 against the Carolina Hurricanes. The blue pants were also used with the "Reverse Retro" uniform during that season. Also during the season, the Blue Jackets unveiled their second "Reverse Retro" uniform, using the 2003–2007 alternate uniform but with a black base and light blue stripes taken from their current alternates.

"The Cannon"

Prior to the start of the 2007–08 season, the Blue Jackets organization brought a hand-made replica 1857 Napoleon cannon into Nationwide Arena. The cannon is "fired" at home games whenever:
 the Blue Jackets take the ice at the start of the game
 the Blue Jackets score a goal
 the Blue Jackets win the game

It was fired 164 times in its inaugural season (41 home games, 20 home victories, 103 goals scored at home). When the Blue Jackets score a goal, the title line of "For Those About to Rock (We Salute You)" by AC/DC is played when the cannon is fired followed by the chorus of "The Whip" by Locksley.

Broadcast
On Bally Sports Ohio, Jeff Rimer serves as the television play-by-play announcer alongside former Blue Jacket Jody Shelley providing color analysis. Rimer started calling games on television in 2005 with Shelley joining Rimer in 2014–15 replacing previous analyst Bill Davidge. Davidge became co-host of Blue Jackets Live, the televised pre-game, intermission and post-game shows, with Brian Giesenschlag until his retirement at the conclusion of the 2018–2019 season. Beginning with the 2019–2020 season, Giesenschlag's co-host is former Blue Jacket Jean-Luc Grand-Pierre. In-game reporting is provided by Dave Maetzold.

On radio stations WBNS-FM (flagship), WBNS (flagship), WXZX (alternative flagship that airs games that conflict with WBNS’s and WBNS-FM’s coverage of Ohio State football or men’s basketball), and 34 other affiliates in Ohio and West Virginia, Bob McElligott provides play-by-play coverage. McElligott joined the Blue Jackets radio broadcast in July 2009 as a color analyst and became the play-by-play analyst for the 2013–14 season, taking over for George Matthews who had been calling Blue Jackets games since the team's inception in 2000. McElligott, along with Dylan Tyrer, hosts the pre-game and post-game radio shows. Fans can interact by e-mail and Twitter with McElligott and Tyrer 
during and after the game.

Mascot
Stinger is the official mascot of the Blue Jackets. Stinger is a 6-foot 9-inch bright green bug that walks amongst the crowd during the games and skates on the ice between periods while wearing a Blue Jackets jersey and a blue hat. Stingers eyebrows are black hockey sticks. Stinger was originally yellow, but was changed to green, eventually mixing with the team's blue. The image of Stinger was on the original Blue Jackets jerseys, eventually being removed in 2003. The team also had another mascot, an anthropomorphic cannon named Boomer, for half of the 2010–11 season.

In-game personalities
Leo Welsh is the official anthem singer of the team. Whenever public address announcer Greg Murray introduces him, the fans shout his first name.

Season-by-season record
This is a partial list of the last five seasons completed by the Blue Jackets. For the full season-by-season history, see List of Columbus Blue Jackets seasons

Note: GP = Games played, W = Wins, L = Losses, T = Ties, OTL = Overtime Losses, Pts = Points, GF = Goals for, GA = Goals against

Players

Current roster

Team captains

 Lyle Odelein, 2000–2002
 Ray Whitney, 2002–2003
 Luke Richardson, 2003–2005
 Adam Foote, 2005–2008
 Rick Nash, 2008–2012
 Nick Foligno, 2015–2021
 Boone Jenner, 2021–present

Team member accomplishments

First-round draft picks

 2000: Rostislav Klesla (4th overall)
 2001: Pascal Leclaire (8th overall)
 2002: Rick Nash (1st overall)
 2003: Nikolay Zherdev (4th overall)
 2004: Alexandre Picard (8th overall)
 2005: Gilbert Brule (6th overall)
 2006: Derick Brassard (6th overall)
 2007: Jakub Voracek (7th overall)
 2008: Nikita Filatov (6th overall)
 2009: John Moore (21st overall)
 2010: Ryan Johansen (4th overall)
 2011: None
 2012: Ryan Murray (2nd overall)
 2013: Alexander Wennberg (14th overall), Kerby Rychel (19th overall), and Marko Dano (27th overall)
 2014: Sonny Milano (16th overall)
 2015: Zach Werenski (8th overall) and Gabriel Carlsson (29th overall)
 2016: Pierre-Luc Dubois (3rd overall)
 2017: None
 2018: Liam Foudy (18th overall)
 2019: None
 2020: Yegor Chinakhov (21st overall)
 2021: Kent Johnson (5th overall), Cole Sillinger (12th overall), and Corson Ceulemans (25th overall)
 2022: David Jiricek (6th overall) and Denton Mateychuk (12th overall)

Retired numbers
The NHL retired Wayne Gretzky's No. 99 for all its member teams at the 2000 NHL All-Star Game.

Honored members
 John H. McConnell

Hall of Famers
 Sergei Fedorov, C, 2005–2008

Awards and trophies

Maurice "Rocket" Richard Trophy
 Rick Nash: 2003–04 (shared with Ilya Kovalchuk of the Atlanta Thrashers and Jarome Iginla of the Calgary Flames)
Vezina Trophy
 Sergei Bobrovsky: 2012–13, 2016–17
Calder Memorial Trophy
 Steve Mason: 2008–09
King Clancy Memorial Trophy
 Nick Foligno: 2016–17

Jack Adams Award
 John Tortorella: 2016–17
Mark Messier Leadership Award
 Nick Foligno: 2016–17
NHL Foundation Player Award
 Rick Nash: 2008–09
NHL first All-Star team
 Sergei Bobrovsky: 2012–13, 2016–17

NHL second All-Star team
 Steve Mason: 2008–09
 Seth Jones: 2017–18
NHL All-Rookie Team
 Rostislav Klesla: 2001–02
 Rick Nash: 2002–03
 Steve Mason: 2008–09
 Zach Werenski: 2016–17
 Elvis Merzlikins: 2019–20

Records

Franchise scoring leaders

These are the top ten-point-scorers in franchise history as of the 2021–22 season.
  – current Blue Jackets player
Note: Pos = Position; GP = Games played; G = Goals; A = Assists; Pts = Points; P/G = Points per game

Single-season records
Single-season records include:

 Points: Artemi Panarin (2018–19) – 87
 Goals: Rick Nash (2003–04) and Cam Atkinson (2018–19) – 41
 Assists: Artemi Panarin (2018–19) – 59
 Game-winning goals: Cam Atkinson (2016–17) – 9
 Penalty minutes: Jody Shelley (2002–03) – 249
 Plus/Minus: David Savard (2016–17) – +33
 Points by a defenseman: Seth Jones (2017–18) – 57
 Goals by a defenseman: Zach Werenski (2019–20) – 20
 Points by a rookie: Pierre-Luc Dubois (2017–18) – 48
 Wins: Sergei Bobrovsky (2016–17) – 41
 Shutouts in a season: Steve Mason (2008–09) – 10
 Goals against average: Sergei Bobrovsky (2012–13) – 2.00
 Save percentage: Sergei Bobrovsky (2012–13) – .932
 Saves: Marc Denis (2002–03) – 2,172
 Longest shutout streak (time without allowing a goal): Steve Mason (2008–09) – 199:19
 Team winning streak – 16 games (November 29, 2016 – January 3, 2017)

See also
 Columbus Chill
 Columbus Owls
 List of Columbus Blue Jackets general managers
 List of Columbus Blue Jackets head coaches

Notes

References

External links

 

 
National Hockey League teams
2000 establishments in Ohio
Ice hockey clubs established in 2000
Ice hockey teams in Ohio
Metropolitan Division
National Hockey League in Ohio
Sports teams in Columbus, Ohio
Events in Columbus, Ohio